Vanessa Duriès, also known as Katia Lamara (1972 – 13 December 1993), was a French novelist.

Biography
She was the author of the French BDSM novel Le lien (translated into English as The Ties that Bind)  allegedly based on her own experience as a BDSM slave. She created quite a stir in France at the time of the release of the novel, due to her youth and beauty, and appeared on national television, in particular in the show of Bernard Pivot. She also appeared in a pictorial and an interview of the May 1993 issue of the French edition of Penthouse magazine.

Duriès died in a car crash on 13 December 1993 in the South of France at age 21. Because of her early death, she has achieved a cult status for some BDSM communities. In 2007, five chapters of her second novel L'Étudiante, left unfinished due to her death, were published in France.

Three other people also died in the crash. The 2007 edition published in Paris by J'ai Lu -- "L'Étudiante suivi de Le Lien", Éditions Blanche,  — which includes an avant-propos by Duriès' editor Franck Spengler and a preface by Florence Dugas, is dedicated: "À la mémoire de Vanessa Duriès, Nathalie Perreau, Jean-Pierre Imbrohoris et leur fils décédés tragiquement le 13 décembre 1993". Spengler avows he was editor to Nathalie Perreau, also, and a friend of Jean-Pierre Imbrohoris. Published in this edition is a short letter written by Duriès to Franck Spengler, inserted between chapters two and three of "L'Étudiante".

References

Further reading
 The Ties That Bind (translated from French) - Masquerade Books - 

1972 births
1993 deaths
BDSM writers
French women novelists
French erotica writers
20th-century French women writers
20th-century French novelists
Road incident deaths in France
Women erotica writers